Barot may refer to:
 Baraolt, Covasna County, Romania, known as Barót in Hungarian
 Barot (caste), a caste 
 Barot (Himachal Pradesh), a picnic spot and tourist location in India
 Barot (Uttar Pradesh), a tehsil in the state of Uttar Pradesh, India
 Navin Chandra Barot, Indian politician

People
 Barot (surname)

See also
 Borat